Saprosites is a genus of scarab beetles in the family Scarabaeidae. There are more than 130 described species in Saprosites.

Species
These 137 species belong to Saprosites, a genus of scarab beetles in the family Scarabaeidae.

 Saprosites abyssinicus Bordat, 1990
 Saprosites africanus Endrödi, 1967
 Saprosites arabicus Pittino, 1984
 Saprosites armatus Pittino, 2008
 Saprosites balthasari Endrödi, 1951
 Saprosites bangueyensis Paulian, 1944
 Saprosites barombii Petrovitz, 1961
 Saprosites bolivianus Petrovitz, 1961
 Saprosites brevitarsis Endrödi, 1964
 Saprosites breviusculus Harold, 1867
 Saprosites bunyaensis Stebnicka & Howden, 1996
 Saprosites burgeoni Paulian, 1939
 Saprosites calvus Schmidt, 1911
 Saprosites camerounensis Paulian, 1940
 Saprosites capitalis Fairmaire, 1883
 Saprosites carinatus Bordat, 1992
 Saprosites cariniceps Pittino, 2008
 Saprosites castaneus Lea, 1923
 Saprosites catenatus (Fauvel, 1903)
 Saprosites cavus Schmidt, 1908
 Saprosites celebicus Paulian, 1944
 Saprosites cheesmani Paulian, 1939
 Saprosites chyuluensis Paulian, 1939
 Saprosites clydensis Stebnicka & Howden, 1996
 Saprosites communis (Broun, 1880)
 Saprosites comorianus Bordat, 1990
 Saprosites consonus Schmidt, 1911
 Saprosites crockerensis Stebnicka, 1991
 Saprosites cycloporum Paulian, 1944
 Saprosites declivis Schmidt, 1911
 Saprosites degallieri Bordat & Théry, 2012
 Saprosites deharvengi Bordat & Théry, 2012
 Saprosites dentipes Harold, 1867
 Saprosites difficilis Harold, 1877
 Saprosites dilutus (Fairmaire, 1849)
 Saprosites distans (Sharp, 1876)
 Saprosites dubius Bordat, 1990
 Saprosites dudichi Endrödi, 1951
 Saprosites dufaui Paulian, 1947
 Saprosites dynastoides (Walker, 1858)
 Saprosites enarotadii Stebnicka, 1998
 Saprosites exaratus (Fleutiaux & Sallé, 1889)
 Saprosites excisus Petrovitz, 1976
 Saprosites explanatus Bordat, 1990
 Saprosites exsculptus (White, 1846)
 Saprosites falcatus Schmidt, 1908
 Saprosites fastus Petrovitz, 1965
 Saprosites fodori Endrödi, 1951
 Saprosites formosensis Nomura, 1939
 Saprosites fortipes (Broun, 1886)
 Saprosites freyi Petrovitz, 1956
 Saprosites gestroi Schmidt, 1911
 Saprosites girardi Bordat, 2003
 Saprosites gnomus Balthasar, 1941
 Saprosites grenadensis Arrow, 1903
 Saprosites guineensis Petrovitz, 1956
 Saprosites haafi Petrovitz, 1956
 Saprosites holzschuhi Pittino, 2008
 Saprosites implicatus Schmidt, 1922
 Saprosites japonicus Waterhouse, 1875
 Saprosites javanus Balthasar, 1941
 Saprosites kaimai Stebnicka, 2005
 Saprosites kapitensis Petrovitz, 1973
 Saprosites kinabalu Pittino, 2008
 Saprosites kingsensis Stebnicka, 2001
 Saprosites komumi Stebnicka, 1998
 Saprosites laeviceps Harold, 1877
 Saprosites laticeps (Fairmaire, 1871)
 Saprosites laticollis Pittino, 2008
 Saprosites lepersonnei Paulian, 1942
 Saprosites lodoicea (Scott, 1912)
 Saprosites lodoiceae (Scott, 1912)
 Saprosites loebli Balthasar, 1972
 Saprosites longethorax Paulian, 1944
 Saprosites madagascariensis Schmidt, 1911
 Saprosites mahavus Stebnicka, 2012
 Saprosites malkini Paulian, 1958
 Saprosites mansuetus Blackburn, 1904
 Saprosites marchionalis Harold, 1877
 Saprosites matangi Stebnicka, 2012
 Saprosites meditans Harold, 1867
 Saprosites mendax (Blackburn, 1891)
 Saprosites merkli Pittino, 2008
 Saprosites mesosternalis Lea, 1923
 Saprosites mistakensis Stebnicka & Howden, 1996
 Saprosites mjoebergi Gillet, 1924
 Saprosites monteverdeae Stebnicka, 2001
 Saprosites narae Lewis, 1895
 Saprosites natalensis (Péringuey, 1901)
 Saprosites nepalensis Pittino, 2008
 Saprosites nitidicollis (MacLeay, 1871)
 Saprosites obscurus Endrödi, 1964
 Saprosites pahangensis Stebnicka, 2012
 Saprosites palmarum (Scott, 1912)
 Saprosites papuanus Stebnicka, 1984
 Saprosites parallelicollis Bordat, 1990
 Saprosites parallelus Harold, 1867
 Saprosites pauliani Bordat, 1990
 Saprosites penrisseni Stebnicka, 2012
 Saprosites perbrevitarsis (Schmidt, 1909)
 Saprosites peregrinus Redtenbacher, 1858
 Saprosites perforatus Bordat, 1990
 Saprosites perssoni Bordat, 1996
 Saprosites pleurophoroides Balthasar, 1971
 Saprosites porongurupae Stebnicka & Howden, 1996
 Saprosites puncticollis Harold, 1867
 Saprosites punctiventris Petrovitz, 1961
 Saprosites pygmaeus Harold, 1877
 Saprosites raffrayi Paulian, 1944
 Saprosites raoulensis (Broun, 1910)
 Saprosites rectus Bordat, 1990
 Saprosites rougemonti Pittino, 2008
 Saprosites rufopolitus Gillet, 1924
 Saprosites rufus Paulian, 1944
 Saprosites schoutedeni Paulian, 1939
 Saprosites sicardi Bordat, 1990
 Saprosites staudingeri Petrovitz, 1969
 Saprosites sternalis Blackburn, 1904
 Saprosites subterraneus Petrovitz, 1976
 Saprosites sulcatissimus (Broun, 1911)
 Saprosites sulcatus Harold, 1869
 Saprosites sulciceps Pittino, 2008
 Saprosites sulcicollis Petrovitz, 1969
 Saprosites tantulus Bordat, 1990
 Saprosites tenuistriatus Bordat, 1990
 Saprosites titschacki Balthasar, 1941
 Saprosites topali Pittino, 2008
 Saprosites verecundus Schmidt, 1909
 Saprosites vosseleri Petrovitz, 1965
 Saprosites watti Stebnicka, 2001
 Saprosites wauensis Stebnicka, 1984
 Saprosites weisei Petrovitz, 1969
 Saprosites wittei Paulian, 1954
 Saprosites yanoi Nomura, 1939
 Saprosites yasutakai Ochi & Kawahara, 2019
 † Saprosites cascus Britton, 1960
 † Saprosites succini (Zang, 1905)

References

External links

 

Scarabaeidae